A Man of Reason is a 2022 South Korean film directed by Jung Woo-sung, in his feature directorial debut. The film will star Jung Woo-sung, Kim Nam-gil, Park Sung-woong, Kim Jun-han. It had its world premiere at the 2022 Toronto International Film Festival on September 13, 2022. The film is slated to release theatrically in South Korea in 2023.

Synopsis 
Soo Hyuk who spent 10 years in jail covering for his boss, is finally released. After learning that, during his time on the inside, he has become the father of a baby girl, Soo Hyuk wants to live a normal life with his former girlfriend, Min-seo, and their daughter, In-bi and cut his ties with the criminal world. But the boss who doesn't want to release  Su-hyuk. The boss hires an assassin to silence him and the hitman holds Soo Hyuk's daughter hostage.

Cast 
 Jung Woo-sung as Soo-hyuk 
 Kim Nam-gil
 Park Sung-woong as Eung-guk
 Kim Jun-han as Seong-joon
 Lee Elijah
 Park Yoo-na

Production 
Principal photography began on February 10, 2020.

Release 
The film was invited to the Special Presentations section at 2022 Toronto International Film Festival where it had its world premiere on September 13, 2022. It was screened at Orivita section at the 55th Sitges Film Festival in October 2022.

The film is slated to release theatrically in South Korea in 2023.

Awards and nominations

References

External links
 
 
 
 
 

2022 films
2020s South Korean films
2020s Korean-language films
South Korean action drama films